Herpetopoma is a genus of sea snails, marine gastropod molluscs of the family Chilodontaidae.

In the past, this genus was often treated as a subgenus of Euchelus. However, this genus may prove to be a composite taxon, given the diversity of the shell forms.

Description
The shell has a turbinate-conic shape as in Euchelus. The spire is elevated. The operculum is multispiral as in a typical Trochus and with more, less rapidly expanding whorls compared with Euchelus. Species in this genus has typically two teeth, joined by a U-shaped notch, where the columella and the basal lips join.

Species
Species within the genus Herpetoma include:

 Herpetopoma alacerrimum Dell, 1956
 Herpetopoma alarconi (Rehder, 1980)
 Herpetopoma annectans (Tate, 1893)
 Herpetopoma aspersum (Philippi, 1846)
 Herpetopoma barbieri Poppe, Tagaro & Dekker, 2006
 Herpetopoma bellum (Hutton, 1873)
 Herpetopoma benthicola Powell, 1937
 Herpetopoma corallinum Jansen, 1994
 Herpetopoma corrugatum (Pease, 1861) 
 Herpetopoma crassilabrum (G. B. Sowerby III, 1905)
 Herpetopoma elevatum Jansen, 1994
 Herpetopoma exasperatum (A. Adams, 1853)
 Herpetopoma fenestratum (Tate, 1893)
 Herpetopoma fimbriatum (Pease, 1861)
 Herpetopoma gemmatum (Gould, 1845)
 Herpetopoma helix (Barnard, 1964)
 Herpetopoma hivaoaense Vilvens, 2017
 Herpetopoma howensis Jansen, 1994
 Herpetopoma instrictum (Gould, 1849)
 † Herpetopoma komiticum (Laws, 1939) 
 Herpetopoma larochei (Powell, 1926)
 Herpetopoma lischkei (Pilsbry, 1904)
 Herpetopoma ludiviniae (Poppe, Tagaro & Dekker, 2006)
 Herpetopoma mariae Finlay, 1930
 Herpetopoma naokoae Poppe, Tagaro & Dekker, 2006
 Herpetopoma nexus (Bozzetti, 2014)
 Herpetopoma norfolkense Jansen, 1994
 Herpetopoma pantantoi Vilvens, 2017
 † Herpetopoma parvumbilicatum (Laws, 1939) 
 Herpetopoma pauperculum (Lischke, 1872) 
 Herpetopoma poichilum Vilvens, 2012
 Herpetopoma pruinosum (Marshall, 1979)
 Herpetopoma pumilio (Tate, 1893)
 Herpetopoma rubrum (A. Adams, 1853)
 Herpetopoma scabriusculum (A. Adams & Angas, 1867)
 Herpetopoma serratocinctum Herbert, 2012
 Herpetopoma seychellarum (G. Nevill & H. Nevill, 1869)
 Herpetopoma stictum Herbert, 2012
 Herpetopoma sulciferum (A. Adams, 1853)
 Herpetopoma verruca (Gould, 1861)
 Herpetopoma vitilevuense Vilvens, 2017
 Herpetopoma vixumbilicatum (Tate, 1893)
 Herpetopoma xeniolum (Melvill, 1918)

Species brought into synonymy
 Herpetopoma aspersa [sic]: synonym of Herpetopoma aspersum (Philippi, 1846) (incorrect gender ending)
 Herpetopoma atratum (Gmelin, 1791): synonym of Euchelus atratus (Gmelin, 1791)
 Herpetopoma bella [sic]: synonym of Herpetopoma bellum (Hutton, 1873)
 Herpetopoma clathratum (A. Adams, 1853): synonym of Vaceuchelus clathratus (A. Adams, 1853)
 Herpetopoma eboreum Vilvens & Heros, 2003: synonym of Herpetopoma xeniolum (Melvill, 1918)
 Herpetopoma fischeri (Montrouzier [in Souverbie & Montrouzier], 1866): synonym of Herpetopoma exasperatum (A. Adams, 1853)
 Herpetopoma foveolatum (A. Adams, 1851): synonym of Vaceuchelus foveolatus (A. Adams, 1853)
 Herpetopoma larochei alacerrima Dell, 1956: synonym of Herpetopoma alacerrimum Dell, 1956
 Herpetopoma providentiae (Melvill, 1909): synonym of Ascetostoma providentiae (Melvill, 1909)
 Herpetopoma ringens (Schepman, 1908): synonym of Ascetostoma ringens (Schepman, 1908)

References

 NZ Mollusca
 Powell A. W. B., New Zealand Mollusca, William Collins Publishers Ltd, Auckland, New Zealand 1979 
 Spencer, H.; Marshall. B. (2009). All Mollusca except Opisthobranchia. In: Gordon, D. (Ed.) (2009). New Zealand Inventory of Biodiversity. Volume One: Kingdom Animalia. 584 pp
 Herbert D.G. (2012) A revision of the Chilodontidae (Gastropoda: Vetigastropoda: Seguenzioidea) of southern Africa and the south-western Indian Ocean. African Invertebrates, 53(2): 381–502

 
Chilodontaidae